Ramya (Sanskrit: रम्य) is a Sanskrit female given name, which means "pleasant" and "delightful".

Notable people 
 Ramya (born 1982), Indian actress and politician
 Ramya Barna (born 1986), Indian actress
 Ramya Krishnan (born 1970), Indian actress
 Ramya Mohan, British doctor
 Remya Nambeesan (born 1986), Indian actress
 Ramya NSK, Indian playback singer
 Ramya Ramana (born 1995) American poet
 Ramya Sri (born 1970), Indian actress
 Ramya Subramanian, Indian actress and television host

See also 
 Remya (disambiguation), include list of people with name Remya

References

Hindu given names
Indian feminine given names